An unlooper is a smart card repair device intended to break the card's microcontroller out of an infinite loop that has been either accidentally or intentionally programmed into the card's internal memory.

A looped smart card is generally unusable, and may be permanently rendered nonfunctional (bricked) unless an unlooper is able to get the microcontroller out of the infinite loop.

An unlooper is a tool that has both legal and illegal purposes, for use by smart card software developers to recover from programming mistakes, and by those attempting to hack smart card security systems.

See also
Smart card

Smart cards